Vägen hem till dej is a 1991 studio album from Swedish pop and country singer Kikki Danielsson.

Track listing

Contributing musicians 
Kikki Danielsson, vocals
Peter Ljung, keyboard
Lasse Wellander, guitar
Klas Anderhell, drums
Rutger Gunnarsson, bass

References

1991 albums
Kikki Danielsson albums